is a Japanese actress. She has appeared in more than sixty films since 1971. She starred in over fifty Nikkatsu Roman Porno films in eight years and once was married to Nikkatsu director Masaru Konuma, even though they later divorced.

Selected filmography

References

External links 

1952 births
Living people
Japanese film actresses